Angels & Vampires – Volume I is Sananda Maitreya's sixth album, released in 2005 on his own official website. It was his first album to be released under his new legal name; previous albums were credited under the stage name of Terence Trent D'Arby.

The album was released only as an internet download and introduced a more organic, stripped-down sound, quite different from Maitreya's earlier albums that had heavily taken advantage of electronic equipment.

This album was released together with volume II as a limited double CD release in 2007, the double set is only available on his official website and during concerts.

Track listing

"Four Shadow" – 0:51
"Angie" – 2:09
"Boolay Boolay" – 2:33
"More Than You Do" – 2:19
"Reach Out" – 4:03
"I'm Your Daddy" – 3:31
"Dolphin" – 5:42
"Time Takes Time" – 2:23
"Share Your Pain" – 3:06
"We are the Living" – 5:02
"It Ain't Been Easy" – 3:16
"Psychotherapy" – 3:56
"Bella Faccina" – 3:48
"The Kind of Girl" – 4:26
"If All I've Got" – 2:09
"Losing Becomes Too Easy" – 5:19
"Daddy, Can I Have a War?" – 2:57
"Gloria (Maitreya's Song)" – 4:54
"She Knows I'm Leaving" – 2:53
"Right Brain Says" – 3:04

External links
Sananda Maitreya's Official Site Includes a more detailed discography

2005 albums
Terence Trent D'Arby albums